Korean airline crash may refer to crashes involving various Korean-based airlines, including:

 Asiana Airlines Flight 214, a scheduled transpacific passenger flight from Incheon, South Korea, that crash-landed at its destination at San Francisco, California, United States, on July 6, 2013;
 Asiana Airlines Flight 991 (OZ991, AAR991) a cargo flight which crashed into the Korea Strait after departing South Korea on July 28, 2011;
 Korean Air Cargo Flight 8509 was a cargo fight from South Korea bound for Italy, that crashed shortly after take-off from London Stansted Airport on December 22, 1999;
 Korean Air Flight 801 (KE801, KAL801), a chartered  passenger flight from South Korea to the United States territory of Guam which crashed on its landing approach on August 6, 1997; 
 Asiana Air Flight 733 (OZ733, AAR733), a domestic passenger flight between Seoul and Mokpo, South Korea that crashed into Mt. Ungeo on July 26, 1993;
 Korean Air incidents and accidents, a list of various incidents and accidents over the past several decades involving Korean Air Lines Co. aircraft;